Betty Ann Bjerkreim Nilsen (born 7 September 1986) is a Norwegian orienteering competitor and cross-country skier. She was a junior World Champion in both sports. At senior level she has won a gold medal in relay at the World Orienteering Championships.

Orienteering
Bjerkreim Nilsen won a gold medal in the relay at the 2005 Junior World Orienteering Championships. In 2006, she received an individual gold medal in the middle distance, and a silver medal in the short course. She participated in the 2007 World Cup, where her best single result was a fifth in the sprint distance at O-Ringen. At the 2009 World Orienteering Championships in Miskolc she won a gold medal in the relay, together with Anne Margrethe Hausken and Marianne Andersen.

Cross-country skiing
She received a gold medal in the relay at the 2005 Junior World Championships in cross-country skiing, and again in 2006. She debuted in the senior world cup in November 2006, and competed in the World Championships in Sapporo in 2007.

Cross-country skiing results
All results are sourced from the International Ski Federation (FIS).

World Championships

World Cup

Season standings

Team podiums

 1 podium

References

External links
 
 

1986 births
Living people
Sportspeople from Kristiansand
Norwegian orienteers
Norwegian female cross-country skiers
Female orienteers
Foot orienteers
World Orienteering Championships medalists
Junior World Orienteering Championships medalists